The first season of The Bellflower Bunnies, a children's animated series based on the Beechwood Bunny Tales books by Geneviève Huriet and Loïc Jouannigot, aired on France's TF1 network during the week of 24 December 2001, at 7:00 a.m. Central European Time.  Consisting of four episodes, it was directed by French animator Moran Caouissin, produced by Patricia Robert, and written by Valérie Baranski. The music was composed by Baranski and Daniel Scott. A handful of crew members from this season would be carried over for future episodes.

The episodes follow the adventures of the Bellflowers, a family of seven rabbits who live in the community of Beechwood Grove. The two adults, Papa Bramble and Aunt Zinnia, take care of their five children: Periwinkle, Poppy, Mistletoe, Dandelion and Violet.  "Room to Move", the first episode in the official production order, deals with the family's move to their new house at Blueberry Hill.

The first season has been broadcast on TF! Jeunesse, the children's service of TF1, as well as South Korea's Educational Broadcasting System (EBS), CBBC in the United Kingdom, and Germany's Kinderkanal (KI.KA) and ZDF among others.  Since early 2003, it has been made available on DVD in the United States, France, Germany and South Korea.

Production
The season was a co-production of France's TF1, its subsidiaries Protécréa and Banco Production, and Canada's TVA International.  It was produced in association with France's Sofica Valor 6 and Luxembourg's Melusine, and with the participation of the Centre National de la Cinématographie (CNC).  Production began in late 2000 at a cost of €380,000 (C$610,000) per episode.  Graphics and Animation of Antwerp, Belgium, a subsidiary of Luxembourg's Studio 352, designed the layouts for these episodes, and North Korea's SEK Studio handled overseas animation duties.  Premium Sound, based in Montreal, was responsible for the sound effects, design, dialogue editing, foley and mix.  Early during the show's production, the crew created a one-minute promotional pilot, in which a little mouse tells of the show's premise and introduces its main characters.

This season represented TF1 International at the conferences of the National Association of Television Program Executives (NATPE) in early 2001 and 2002, and MIPTV Media Market in April 2001.  For both events, the four episodes were promoted as "specials".

The first two episodes of the series were planned to air on TF1 in November 2001, with the next two to follow in December.  Ultimately, all four premiered in late December on TF! Jeunesse.

Cast and crew

The first season's English voice cast included Rhonda Millar (who played two characters, Periwinkle and Pirouette), as well as Tom Clarke Hill, Tom Eastwood, Regine Candler and Joanna Ruiz Rodriguez.  Their voices were recorded at Ten Pin Alley, a company based in Gloucestershire, England.

The director of this season, Moran Caouissin, was previously involved in DuckTales the Movie: Treasure of the Lost Lamp as an animator. Character designer Josette Zagar previously worked in the trace and paint department for The Twelve Tasks of Asterix.  Co-producer Louis Fournier once served Cinar as Vice President of Sales & Co-productions; during this season's production, he was President of TVA International's Youth and Animation Unit. Fournier's partner, Dominique Mendel, became Vice President of Montreal's Spectra Animation in November 2004.  Daniel Scott, a Canadian composer who created the theme for Wimzie's House, teamed up with Valérie Baranski to write the score and songs.  Several more would return for the next season: screenwriter Baranski, producer Patricia Robert, and story editor Fabrice Ziolkowski to name a few.

Reception
José Evrard of France's DVDcritiques.com wrote of The Bellflower Bunnies' first season: "[It] combines quality entertainment with a charming style that can be found in children's books. The stories, full of tenderness, emotion and humour, develop in a magical world where everything is done to give the young viewer true moments of joy! Every event with our little heroes—so mischievous and affectionate—is a delight."  In the United States, Dove Foundation reviewer Linda Eagle praised the episodes as "an adorable piece of animation", and gave both Region 1 DVDs four stars out of five.

Episodes
This season, based entirely on books in the Beechwood Bunny Tales series, is about 92 minutes long. In each episode, the Bellflower children perform a song whose title does not appear in the credits.

DVD releases

Region 2 (Europe)

France
The first season was also released by TF1 Vidéo on 23 January 2003 and again on 19 February 2004. Its only special features were a collection of songs from the episodes and a DVD-ROM weblink to the distributor's site.

Germany
On 22 February 2008, in time for Easter,  released the German-dubbed version as Die Häschenbande, Folge 1. This came about as a result of the show's success on local television. The extras were colouring pages and previews of other  products.

Netherlands
Under the series title De Knuffel Konijntjes, Dutch FilmWorks B.V. released the first four episodes individually in the mid-2000s; all of these were put together in a box set on 21 March 2006. The third volume in this version, "Hoog in de Lucht" ("Balloonatic Bunnies"), was released several months before #2, "Carnaval" ("Carnival").

Region 1 (North America)
As part of a marketing deal with TVA, the English version of Season 1 was distributed on VHS by the Utah-based Feature Films for Families (FFF) in 2001; the Region 1 DVD versions came out on 1 October 2003. Extras on both discs included trailers for other FFF releases and special messages from the distributor's staff.

Region 3 (Asia)
The first season was released on DVD and VHS by South Korea's C4U Entertainment in February 2005 as 까르르 토끼 친구들. There, they are titled "이사가는 날" ("Room to Move"), "축제는 즐거워" ("Carnival"), "열기구 대소동" ("Balloonatic Bunnies") and "달려라, 썰매야!" ("Slide On").

See also
 List of The Bellflower Bunnies episodes

Notes

References
General

Specific

External links
 The Bellflower Bunnies at TF1.fr

Official sites for this season's distributors:
Feature Films for Families (U.S.)
TF1 Vidéo (France)
edelkids (Germany)
Dutch FilmWorks (Netherlands)
C4U Entertainment (South Korea)
Trailers for the first two Region 1 volumes at YouTube:
"Room to Move" / "Carnival"
"Balloonatic Bunnies" / "Slide On"
 2-minute clip of "Room to Move" at KI.KA site
 Moran Caouissin's page at MotionGraphic, with backgrounds, sketches and illustrations by the animator and Loïc Jouannigot

2001 Canadian television seasons
2001 French television seasons